Rattan Chadha was the founder and CEO of Mexx till he sold it in 2004. Mexx had grown to 1,200 stores in 56 countries with annual sales of one billion Euro's and 6,500 employees.

After the sale of Mexx, Rattan started his own private equity company KRC Capital B.V. to invest in hotels, real estate and leisure.

He is founder and executive chairman of citizenM, a hotel chain that with hotels in Amsterdam, Rotterdam, London, Glasgow, Paris, Copenhagen, Zurich, New York, Boston, Seattle, Taipei, Kuala Lumpur, Shanghai.

He is the president & owner of the Royal Mougins Golf Resort in Mougins (France) – a championship 18 holes golf course, with a hotel and spa.

Besides the above, Rattan has various controlling investments in real estate developments in India and America.

Awards 
In 2000 he was knighted by the Queen of the Netherlands as a “Ridder” for his entrepreneurial success and his various philanthropic activities.

In 2004 he won the “Grand Seigneur” award of the Netherlands – the highest award in the country for excellence in branding and lifestyle marketing.

Further in 2008 he was awarded the “China Trader Award” for his “lifetime achievements” for the unique way he encouraged & developed trade relations between China & The Netherlands over several decades.

In June 2022, he was featured on the Global 100 in Hospitality by the International Hospitality Institute as one of the 100 Most Powerful People in Global Hospitality.

References

1949 births
Living people
Dutch businesspeople
Indian emigrants to the Netherlands
People from Delhi